Force Four Entertainment is a Canadian film and television production company based in Vancouver.

Force Four Entertainment began operations in 1983 and has produced more than 500 hours of primetime broadcast programming, earning accolades on both the national and international stage.

The company’s television programs include lifestyle, documentary, and scripted programming that is sold and aired around the world. In the scripted genre is the 13-episode comedy series Seed, created by Joseph Raso for City TV. Force Four creates and produces its own original formats, including Million Dollar Neighbourhood for Corus’ OWN Canada, Urban Suburban for HGTV, The Cupcake Girls for W Network, and Murder She Solved for OWN Canada. The company is also producing the Australian format series Border Security for Shaw, now in its second season, The Bachelor Canada, based on the sixteen-season Warner Brothers hit U.S. franchise for Rogers Media, and The Audience, an ITV format for W Network.

History

On August 28, 2014, the firm was taken over by acquired Ontario-based eOne Entertainment. The firm's partners Rob Bromley, John Richie, and Gillian Lowrey joined eOne as part of the deal.

List of television series and films produced and distributed by Force Four Entertainment

Keeping Canada Safe
Keeping Canada Alive
Chuck and Danny's Road Trip
Tricked
Border Security: America's Front Line
Battle Cats
Urban Suburban
Border Security: Canada's Front Line
The Cupcake Girls
Murder She Solved
Tube Tales: TV's Real Stories
Six Degrees of TV
65 Redroses
Manhattan Matchmaker
The Bachelor Canada
Million Dollar Neighbourhood
Family Cook Off
Murder She Solved: True Crime
Playing for Keeps
Human Cargo
The Love Crimes of Gillian Guess
Murder Unveiled
Jinnah on Crime: Pizza 911
Jinnah on Crime: White Knight, Black Widow
Village on a Diet
Tube Tales: TV's Real Stories
The Shopping Bags
Making It Big
You, Me & the Kids
Adventures in Parenting
Wakanheja
Art Zone
Frank Mahovlich: The Big M
Terry Fox: A Dream as Big as Our Country
Better Ask Nellie: Nellie Cournoyea
Family Drew: The Molson Family
Brothers: The Phil and Tony Esposito Story
Silken Laumann: Flying on Water
Emily Carr: A Woman of All Sorts
Lynn Johnston: Lynn's Looking Glass
Christine Silverberg: Top Cop
Rick Hansen: Never Give Up On Your Dreams
Today Is a Good Day: Remembering Chief Dan George
Carbon Hunters
End of an Era
Toxic Legacies
Grizzlies of the Canadian Rockies
Crocophiles
Corrie Crazy: Canada Loves Coronation Street
Brothel Project
FASD: Finding Hope
Rock and Roll Kid
Making Waves
The Ties That Bind
Fall Out
Without God
Sing Out
Welcome Back to Molly's Reach
Wanderings: A Journey to Connect
From Grief to Action
Innocent Tricks
Broken Words
Love, Culture and the Kitchen Sink
Laughing Through the Pain
Seed (TV series)

References

External links
Official website

Entertainment One
Television production companies of Canada
Companies based in Vancouver
Film production companies of Canada
Cinema of British Columbia
Mass media companies established in 1983
1983 establishments in British Columbia
2014 mergers and acquisitions